Joakim Nilsson (born March 30, 1971) is a Swedish former All-American javelin thrower who competed for the Alabama Crimson Tide, 1991-1995. At the end of his career, he was awarded the prestigious Bryant Student Athlete Award (1995), named after Paul "Bear" Bryant. Joakim's younger brother, Mats Nilsson, carried on the strong family tradition and won the NCAA Division 1 javelin title in 1997 for the University of Alabama.

References

1971 births
Living people
Swedish male javelin throwers